Orphulella is a genus of slant-faced grasshoppers in the family Acrididae. There are more than 20 described species in Orphulella, all found in the Americas.

Species
These 24 species belong to the genus Orphulella:

 Orphulella abbreviata (Scudder, 1869)
 Orphulella aculeata Rehn, 1900
 Orphulella brachyptera Rehn & Hebard, 1938
 Orphulella chumpi Cigliano, Pocco & Lange, 2011
 Orphulella concinnula (Walker, 1870)
 Orphulella decisa (Walker, 1870)
 Orphulella elongata Bruner, 1911
 Orphulella fluvialis Otte, 1979
 Orphulella gemma Otte, 1979
 Orphulella losamatensis Caudell, 1909
 Orphulella nesicos Otte, 1979
 Orphulella orizabae (McNeill, 1897)
 Orphulella paraguayensis (Rehn, 1906)
 Orphulella patruelis (Bolívar, 1896)
 Orphulella pelidna (Burmeister, 1838) (spotted-winged grasshopper)
 Orphulella pernix Otte, 1979
 Orphulella punctata (De Geer, 1773)
 Orphulella quiroga Otte, 1979
 Orphulella scudderi (Bolívar, 1888)
 Orphulella speciosa (Scudder, 1863) (slant-faced pasture grasshopper)
 Orphulella timida Otte, 1979
 Orphulella tolteca (Saussure, 1861)
 Orphulella trypha Otte, 1979
 Orphulella vittifrons (Walker, 1870)

References

Further reading

External links

 

 
Acrididae genera
Articles created by Qbugbot